My World is the debut studio album by American country music artist Cyndi Thomson. Released in July 2001 (see 2001 in country music), it is also her only studio album to date. Its lead-off single, "What I Really Meant to Say", was a Number One single on the Billboard Hot Country Singles & Tracks (now Hot Country Songs) charts in late 2001. Also released were "I Always Liked That Best" and "I'm Gone".

Track listing

Personnel
Compiled from liner notes.
 J. T. Corenflos — electric guitar, 12-string guitar
 Dan Dugmore — steel guitar, mandolin, acoustic guitar, electric guitar, 12-string guitar, dobro
 Stuart Duncan — fiddle
 David Huff — drum programming, percussion
 Tommy Lee James — background vocals
 Tim Lauer — accordion
 John Mock — penny whistle
 Greg Morrow — drums, percussion
 Steve Nathan — keyboards, piano, Hammond B-3 organ, Wurlitzer electric piano
 Alison Prestwood — bass guitar
 Randy Scruggs — banjo, mandolin, acoustic guitar
 Cyndi Thomson — lead vocals, background vocals
 Biff Watson — acoustic guitar
 Paul Worley — acoustic guitar, electric guitar, 12-string guitar, slide guitar
 Jonathan Yudkin — fiddle, violin, viola, cello

Strings performed by the Nashville String Machine and arranged by Rob Mathes.

Charts

Weekly charts

Year-end charts

References

2001 debut albums
Cyndi Thomson albums
Capitol Records albums
Albums produced by Paul Worley